Goodbye My Love may refer to:

 "Goodbye My Love”,  a 1965 song recorded by The Searchers (original title "Goodbye My Lover Goodbye")
 "Goodbye My Love" (James Brown song), a 1968 song written and recorded by James Brown
 "Goodbye My Love" (グッド・バイ・マイ・ラブ), a 1974 song recorded by Ann Lewis
 "Goodbye My Love”, a 1995 song written by Yoko Ono from the album Rising
 Goodbye My Love (TV series), a South Korean television drama series

See also
 "Goodbye, My Love, Goodbye", a 1973 song recorded by Demis Roussos 
 "Island Love Songs: Goodbye My Love", a 1975 album recorded by Teresa Teng containing a cover of the 1974 song by Ann Lewis
 "Goodbye My Love, Goodbye", a 2006 Italian film also known as The Goodbye Kiss
"Goodbye My Lover", a 2005 song recorded by James Blunt
 "Goodbye My Lover Goodbye", a 1963 song first recorded by Robert Mosely 
 "Goodbye, My Lady Love", a 1900 song written by Joe Howard 
 "Goodbye to Love", a 1972 song recorded by The Carpenters
Adiós, amor mío (English: 'Goodbye my love'), telenovela 
Adiós Amor (disambiguation) 
Goodbye Love (disambiguation)